The Gonzaga–Idaho rivalry was the football game between Gonzaga University and the University of Idaho.  campuses, in Spokane, Washington, and Moscow, Idaho, are approximately  apart.

They did not meet in 1912, 1917, or 1926, and Idaho did not have a varsity team   the Pacific Coast Conference (PCC) in 1922, while Gonzaga remained independent.

Gonzaga's dominating wins in 1939 and 1940, both shutouts, were led by halfback Tony Canadeo, a future member of the Pro Football Hall of Fame. With Canadeo in the NFL, Idaho rebounded in 1941 to win 21–7 in Spokane in what was the final game in 

During World War II, Gonzaga did not field a team after 1941, while Idaho played in 1942 and went on hiatus in  After the war, Idaho resumed football for the 1945 season, but Gonzaga opted not to, as its program had been in financial difficulty before

Game results

 The only one to serve as head coach for both programs was Matty Mathews,who was 1–2–1 while with Idaho , and won during his only season with Gonzaga in 1929.
 Idaho's 1918 team was non-varsity, composed of Student Army Training Corps (SATC) After the Armistice ended World War I on November 11, they played a limited schedule; the first two games were against Gonzaga.The opener in Moscow on November 16 was a 13–7 Idaho win, and the next week in Spokane was a 7–7 tie.

Coaching records
From 1919 through 1941; Idaho

Gonzaga
{|class="sortable wikitable" style="text-align:center"
! Head Coach
! Team
! Games
! Seasons
! Wins
! Losses 
! Ties
! Pct.
|- 
|align=left|William Higgins||Gonzaga||1||1919||0||1||0||
|- 
|align=left|Gus Dorais||Gonzaga||5||1920–1924||1||3||1||
|- 
|align=left|Clipper Smith||Gonzaga||4||1925–1928|||2||0||1||
|- 
|align=left|Matty Mathews||Gonzaga||1||1929|||1||0||0|| 
|- 
|align=left|Ray Flaherty||Gonzaga||1||1930||0||1||0||
|- 
|align=left|Mike Pecarovich||Gonzaga||8||1931–1938||3||5||0||
|- 
|align=left|Puggy Hunton|| Gonzaga ||3||1939–1941||2||1||0||
|}

Idaho
{|class="sortable wikitable" style="text-align:center"
! Head Coach
! Team
! Games
! Seasons
! Wins
! Losses 
! Ties
! Pct.
|- 
|align=left|Ralph Hutchinson||Idaho||1||1919||1||0||0|| 
|- 
|align=left|Thomas Kelley||Idaho||2||1920–1921||2||0||0|| 
|- 
|align=left|Matty Mathews||Idaho||4||1922–1925|||1||2||1||
|- 
|align=left|Charles Erb||Idaho||2||1926–1928||0||1||1||
|- 
|align=left|Leo Calland||Idaho||6||1929–1934||3||3||0||
|- 
|align=left|Ted Bank||Idaho||6||1935–1940||3||3||0||
|- 
|align=left|Francis Schmidt||Idaho||1||1941–1942||1||0||0|| 
|}

Other sports

Men's basketball

After more than a decade, the teams were scheduled to meet in December 2020 in Spokane, but the game was canceled due to COVID-19 issues.

Game results
Since December 1979, Gonzaga leads , all non-league

^ Two games were played at the Spokane Coliseum (Nov 1987, Nov 1988), both won by Idaho

Baseball
In the eleven seasons of baseball in the Big Sky (1964–74), Idaho and Gonzaga each won four league titles. The Vandals were champions in 1964, 1966, 1967, and 1969, while Gonzaga won in 1965, 1971, 1973, and 1974.

Baseball was one of five sports that the Big Sky stopped sponsoring in 1974, so both moved to the new Nor-Pac in 1975, and continued as conference foes until Idaho dropped its program in May 1980.

See also  
 List of NCAA college football rivalry games

References 

College football rivalries in the United States
Idaho Vandals football
Gonzaga Bulldogs football